Childwall railway station was a station located on the North Liverpool Extension Line at Well Lane, Childwall, Liverpool. It opened on 1 December 1879.

The station was distant from the village of Childwall. Passenger services ended in 1931 while it was still a village. The tracks were lifted in early 1979 when Childwall was a suburb of Liverpool with a large population.

History
Childwall railway station was situated on the Cheshire Lines Railway (CLC) North Liverpool Extension Line that connected the CLC Liverpool and Manchester line. The station opened on 1 December 1879 and took its name from the village which was east of the station. The station was on an embankment on the north side of Well Lane; it had a goods yard with one siding. Childwall station closed for passenger service on 1 January 1931, though it remained open for goods until August 1943. After it was fully closed, the station house was demolished.

By 2015 the trackbed though the station site formed part of the Trans Pennine Trail.

References

Sources

External links
 The station via Disused Stations UK
 The closed station on a 1948 O.S. map via npe Maps
 The station on an 1888 OS map overlay via National Library of Scotland
 The station and line HTS via railwaycodes
 The trackbed via Sustrans

Disused railway stations in Liverpool
Former Cheshire Lines Committee stations
Railway stations in Great Britain opened in 1879
Railway stations in Great Britain closed in 1931